Harshavarman II was an Angkorian king who ruled from 941 to 944. He succeeded his father in 941; however, his reign at Koh Ker was brief and "characterized by conflict".  His cousin, Rajendravarman II, wrestled the power away from him and moved the capital back to Yashodharapura. He died in 944 and received the posthumous name of Brahmaloka.

References

10th-century Cambodian monarchs
Khmer Empire
944 deaths
Year of birth unknown